Diocaesarea or Diocaesareia or Diokaisareia, also called Anazarba and Kyinda was a Graeco-Roman town located in Cilicia Trachea mentioned by Ptolemy and the ecclesiastical authorities. It was in time assigned to the late Roman province of Isauria. It was a bishopric; no longer the seat a residential bishop, it remains a titular see of the Roman Catholic Church.

Its site is located near Uzuncaburç in Asiatic Turkey.

References

Populated places in ancient Cilicia
Populated places in ancient Isauria
Former populated places in Turkey
Catholic titular sees in Asia
History of Mersin Province
Roman towns and cities in Turkey